This is a list of CollegeInsider.com Postseason Tournament (CIT) bids by school. The tournament is oriented toward mid-major schools who did not get selected to go to the NCAA Tournament or NIT. The first CIT was played in 2009.

School names listed here reflect those currently used by their athletic programs, which may not reflect names used when a team made a CIT appearance.

See also
NCAA Men's Division I Tournament bids by school
NCAA Men's Division I Tournament bids by school and conference
NCAA Women's Division I Tournament bids by school
NIT bids by school and conference
NCIT bids by school
CBI bids by school

References

College men's basketball records and statistics in the United States
CollegeInsider.com Postseason Tournament